Özcan Bizati (born 19 May 1968) is a Turkish football manager.

References

1968 births
Living people
Turkish football managers
Gençlerbirliği S.K. non-playing staff
MKE Ankaragücü managers
Denizlispor managers
Boluspor managers
Bursaspor non-playing staff
Bursaspor managers